Iraq for Sale: The War Profiteers is a 2006 documentary film made by Robert Greenwald and Brave New Films. Produced while the Iraq War was in full swing, the film deals with the alleged war profiteering and negligence of private contractors and consultants who went to Iraq as part of the US war effort.

Specifically, the film claims four major contractors - Blackwater, K.B.R.-Halliburton, CACI and Titan   - were over-billing the U.S. government and doing substandard work while endangering the lives of American soldiers, Iraqi civilians, and their own employees. These corporations were tasked with “virtually everything except the actual killing,” including food, laundry, housing, security, intelligence gathering and interrogation.

Synopsis

The film starts with the events of March 2004 in Fallujah, where four Blackwater contractors were ambushed, set afire, their burned corpses dragged through the streets and then finally displayed hanging from a bridge.  In interviews, two of the contractors’ families contend that Blackwater, in search of higher profit, neglected to provide proper support and protection to their employees, including maps, decent translators, an armored vehicle, and sufficient security personnel (their convoy was short a machine gunner). The families contend  that with such support, their loved ones might be alive today.

Iraq for Sale then takes contractors Titan and CACI to task for providing “interrogation support” for the notorious Abu Ghraib prison. These civilian contractors were outside the chain of military command, and were never held accountable for the amply documented, unsupervised torture they initiated.

According to interviews with survivors, Halliburton subsidiary KBR was responsible for the 2004 Iraq KBR convoy ambush deaths of six drivers who the corporation irresponsibly put into dangerous zones -  zones which were supposed to be off limits to civilians. Also, in interviews, Halliburton’s former employees charge that while the company had a sole contract to provide purified water for US troops, they actually distributed contaminated drinking water.

Greenwald and Brave New Films document that at the time of production, the corporations in question had made more than tens of billions of dollars from their contracts in Iraq.  In part this was because the companies were working under “cost-plus” contracts, which reimbursed whatever they spent in expenses, plus extra, for profit.  This means that they actually made more money when they destroyed expensive equipment and machinery, rather than repairing it. The film features footage of a burning $80,000 truck (whose only problem was a blown tire) that Halliburton had set afire on the side of the road rather than replacing the tire.

Some of the other allegations brought up in the film include:
The contracting companies enjoyed close relationships with important figures in Washington DC, including then-President George W Bush and other high-ranking Republicans.
Congress often awarded “no-bid” contracts to these private companies.
These contracts, instead of saving money for US taxpayers, actually resulted in billions of dollars of unnecessary waste.
Contractors cut corners on the safety and training of their personnel, often with lethal results.

Production and Distribution
This was the first film to raise substantial production funds from small donations online: $267,892 from 3,000 people in 10 days.
The film had a limited theatrical release. It was simultaneously released on DVD and shown nationwide at thousands of Brave New Films’ hallmark “house parties.”

Reception
Iraq for Sale is among the best-reviewed of Brave New Films’ filmography, earning 100% approval from critics aggregated by Rotten Tomatoes. The New York Times called it “a horrifying catalog of greed, corruption and incompetence among private contractors in Iraq,” adding the film is “extremely effective.” Salon says it was “dogged and impressive investigative reporting,” and the Village Voice called it “a much needed reminder of the criminal negligence of those who lead the troops into this mess and those who have gotten rich off of it.”

Contractor’s response
Greenwald attempted to interview representatives of the companies in question for the film, to no avail. 
Halliburton contends the film is "yet another rehash of inaccurate, recycled information." Eric Prince, founder of Blackwater, dismissed the film as “election year left-wing politics.” On their website’s FAQ, CACI says it would be a “maliciously false accusation” to call them war profiteers.

Participants 
Katy Helveston-Wettengel - Mother of Scott Helveston
Donna & Jozo Zovko - Parents of Jerry Zovko
Tom Zovko - Brother of Jerry Zovko
Chris Lehane - Crisis Communication Expert
Anthony Lagouranis - Military Interrogator, Abu Ghraib
Janis Karpinski - Former Brigadier General, Abu Ghraib
Shereef Akeel - Civil Rights Attorney
Hassan Al-Azzawi - Abu Ghraib Detainee
Pratap Chatterjee - Executive Director, CorpWatch
Al Haj Ali - Abu Ghraib Detainee
Mark Benjamin - Journalist, Salon.com
Joshua Casteel - Military Interrogator, Abu Ghraib
Marwan Mawiri - Titan Linguist, Kirkuk Airbase, Iraq
Alan Grayson - Grayson and Kubli, P.C.
Massie Ritsch - OpenSecrets
Aidan Delgado - SPC, Army Reserve, Nasiriyah & Abu Ghraib
Doug Brooks - President, IPOA
David Mann - SPC, US Army
Geoff Millard - SGT, Army National Guard
Ed Sanchez - KBR/Halliburton Former Truck Driver
Kim & April Johnson - Family of Tony Johnson
Hollie Hullet - Wife of Steve Hullet
Bill Peterson - KBR/Halliburton Former Truck Driver
Scott Allen - Cruse, Scott, Henderson & Allen, LLP
Keith Ashdown - Taxpayers for Common Sense
Ralph Peters - Lieutenant Colonel (Ret)
Bunnatine Greenhouse - Former Chief Contracting Officer, USACE
Ben Carter - KBR/Halliburton Former Water Purification Specialist
Shane Ratliff - KBR/Halliburton Former Truck Driver
Marie de Young - KBR/Halliburton Former Contract Administrator
Stewart Scott - KBR/Halliburton Former Labor Foreman
James Logsdon - KBR/Halliburton Former Truck Driver
Bud Conyers - KBR/Halliburton Former Truck Driver
Kelly Dougherty - SGT, Colorado Army National Guard
Harry Bunting - KBR/Halliburton Former Procurement Specialist
Jim Donahue - Halliburton Watch
Charles Lewis - Fund for Independence in Journalism
Chris Farrell - Judicial Watch
Charlie Cray - Center for Corporate Policy

References

External links 
 
 
 L.A. Times review, Los Angeles Times, September 8, 2006
 Being There Magazine review, Being There Magazine
 "Iraq For Sale: documentary about profiteering contractors", Boing Boing, September 24, 2006
 San Francisco Chronicle review, San Francisco Chronicle, September 15, 2006
 New York Times review, New York Times, September 9, 2006

American documentary films
Documentary films about the Iraq War
2006 films
2006 documentary films
Documentary films about American politics
Documentary films about the military–industrial complex
Films directed by Robert Greenwald
Films about privatization
2000s English-language films
2000s American films